Events in the year 1943 in the British Mandate of Palestine.

Incumbents
 High Commissioner – Sir Harold MacMichael
 Emir of Transjordan – Abdullah I bin al-Hussein
 Prime Minister of Transjordan – Tawfik Abu al-Huda

Events

 18 February – World War II : The Polish Anders Army arrive in Palestine, where many Polish Jews, including Menachem Begin, desert to work on establishing a Jewish state in Palestine. This becomes known as the 'Anders Aliyah'.
 12 May – The founding of the kibbutz Gvulot.
 1 – 20 November Lehi members flee from the Latrun Detention Camp through a 70 meter long tunnel.
 December – The founding of the kibbutz Yad Mordechai.

Notable births
 2 January – Daniel Pe'er, Israeli television host and newsreader (died 2017)
 1 March – Benny Begin, Israeli geologist and politician
 9 April – Uri Gil, Israeli Air Force officer
 30 April – Ze'ev Boim, Israeli politician and Knesset member (died 2011)
 30 April – Nechemya Cohen, Israeli army officer, the most decorated soldier in the history of the IDF (died 1967)
 7 May – Herzl Bodinger, Israeli Air Force commander
 18 May – Gershon Shefa, Israeli Olympic swimmer
 19 May – Yosef Ahimeir, Israeli politician and journalist
 2 June – Mordechai Shmuel Ashkenazi, Israeli rabbi, chief rabbi of Kfar Chabad (died 2015)
 8 June – Uri Davis, Israeli academic and anti-Zionist political activist
12 June – Benjamin Beit-Hallahmi, Israeli psychology professor
 2 August – Uzi Landau, Israeli politician
 5 August – Uri Sagi, Israeli general
 18 September – Issak Tavior, Israeli pianist, composer, and conductor
 25 September – Yoav Gelber, Israeli historian
 7 October – Yoram Globus, Israeli film producer and cinema owner
 26 October – Ron Ben-Yishai, Israeli journalist
 8 November – Boaz Davidson, Israeli film director, producer, and screenwriter
 22 November – Naomi Blumenthal, Israeli politician
 12 December – Hanan Porat, former Israeli politician (died 2011)
 18 December – Hanoch Levin, Israeli playwright, theater director, author and poet (died 1999)
 Full date unknown
 Yekutiel Gershoni, Israeli historian and paralympic champion
 Dina Porat, Israeli historian
 Tanya Reinhart, Israeli linguist and peace activist (died 2007)
 Mubarak Awad, Palestinian Arab, Arab-American psychologist and political activist

Notable deaths

 1 January – Arthur Ruppin (born 1876), German-born Zionist Palestinian Jewish leader
 14 October – Shaul Tchernichovsky (born 1875), Russian-born Palestinian Jewish Hebrew poet

 
Palestine
Years in Mandatory Palestine
Mandatory Palestine in World War II